Carmen Fraga Estévez (born 19 October 1948, in León) is a Spanish politician of the People's Party, who served as a Member of the European Parliament from 1994 until 2014. She is a member of the Bureau of the European People's Party.

During her time in parliament, Fraga Estévez served on the Committee on Agriculture and Rural Development and the Committee on Fisheries. In addition to her committee assignments, she was also a member of the Delegation for relations with the Maghreb countries and the Arab Maghreb Union (including Libya).

She is the daughter of Manuel Fraga - the late politician and professor.

Education
 Graduate in humanities with specialisation in geography

Career
 1965-1970: special prize on graduation
 1980-1985: Graduate in law
 since 1970: Official in Ministry of Public Works
 1986-1994: EPP Group official
 1994-2002: Member of the European Parliament
 First Vice-Chairwoman of the EPP-ED Group
 1997-1999: Chairwoman of the Committee on Fisheries
 2002-2004: Secretary-General for Maritime Fisheries

See also
 2004 European Parliament election in Spain

External links
 
 

1948 births
Living people
People from León, Spain
People's Party (Spain) MEPs
MEPs for Spain 2004–2009
MEPs for Spain 2009–2014
21st-century women MEPs for Spain